Essentials of Post–Cold War Deterrence is a document produced in 1995 as a "Terms of Reference" by the Policy Subcommittee of the Strategic Advisory Group (SAG) of the United States Strategic Command (current USSTRATCOM, former CINCSTRAT), a branch of the Department of Defense. The document, drafted under former Commander-in-Chief of CINCSTRAT Admiral Chiles, is to be used as a baseline for future policies and strategies in "expanding the Deterrence of the Use of Weapons of mass destruction." Although originally classified, it has since been declassified and published by the Nautilus Institute.

The Introduction of the document states the following:

Over the period of the Cold War, both the United States and the Soviet Union developed an understanding of deterrence and its role in preventing war with one another. With the end of the Cold War and the spread of Weapons of mass destruction, deterrence takes on a broader multinational dimension. This paper addresses the broader view of deterrence and the question, "How do we deter nations, other than the Former Soviet Union, from using Weapons of Mass Destruction?"

The article is notable not only for its significance in outlining current United States military strategy and foreign policy, but also for its explicit advocation of ambiguity regarding "what is permitted" for other nations and its endorsement of "irrationality", or more precisely, the perception thereof, as an important tool in deterrence and foreign policy.

The document claims that the capacity of the United States in exercising deterrence would be hurt by portraying U.S. leaders as fully rational and cool-headed, stating that:

See also
 Deterrence theory
 Peace through strength

External links
Essentials of Post-Cold War Deterrence 1995, PDF version of the document.

U.S. Strategic Command Official USSTRATCOM website.

Nuclear warfare
Nuclear strategy
1995 documents